John Rimmer may refer to:

 John Rimmer (athlete) (1878–1962), British athlete and Olympian
 John Rimmer (composer) (born 1939), New Zealand composer